Henning Baum (born  20 September 1972) is a German film and TV actor. He is best known for his performance as Michael 'Mick' Brisgau in the TV Series Der letzte Bulle  (The Last Cop).

Selected filmography
Mädchen, Mädchen (2001), as Trainer Chris
Der letzte Bulle (2010–2014, TV series, 60 episodes), as Mick Brisgau
 (2010, TV film), as Johannes Müller
 (2014, TV film), as Götz von Berlichingen
Mädchen, Mädchen (2016), as Gerhard "Rex" Maier
 (2018), as Luke the Engine Driver

References

External links
 
 Agency profile

1972 births
Living people
Actors from Essen
German male film actors
German male television actors
21st-century German male actors